This article details the squads that will participate in the Illinois Regional of the 2021 edition of The Basketball Tournament, held in Peoria.

Squads

No. 1 Golden Eagles

No. 2 House of 'Paign

No. 3 Boeheim's Army

No. 4 Always Us

No. 5 Autism Army

No. 6 The OverLooked

No. 7 Always a Brave

No. 8 Brotherly Love

No. 9 Playing for Jimmy V

No. 10 Tubby Time

No. 11 Team HEARTFIRE

No. 12 SCD Hoops

No. 13 Peoria All-Stars

No. 14 Forces of Seoul

No. 15 Jackson TN Underdawgs

No. 16 B1 Ballers

References

The Basketball Tournament